Sweet Country is a 2017 Australian drama film, directed by Warwick Thornton. Set in 1929 in the sparsely populated outback of the Northern Territory and based on a series of true events, it tells a harsh story against the backdrop of a divided society (between the white settlers and Aboriginal Australians) in the interwar period in Australia.

It was first screened in the main competition section of the 74th Venice International Film Festival in September 2017 and after winning the Special Jury Prize award there, went on to win several awards internationally.

Plot
Sam Kelly is a middle-aged Aboriginal farm worker in the outback of Australia's Northern Territory some time after the end of the First World War. His employer, Fred Smith, a kindly preacher, agrees to lend Sam, his wife, Lizzie, and his niece, Lucy, to a bitter, abusive, and alcoholic veteran of World War I named Harry March on a neighbouring farm to renovate the latter's paddock fences. After sending Sam out to round up some cattle, Harry rapes Lizzie, and threatens to skin her and Sam and rape Lucy if Lizzie tells Sam. Sam's relationship with Harry quickly deteriorates.

Later, Harry visits the farm on which Sam works looking for a runaway Aboriginal youth named Philomac, who had escaped after Harry had chained him up to stop him from stealing. Harry fires rifle shots into the house then kicks in the door, leading Sam (who is inside with Lizzie) to pick up a gun and kill Harry in self-defence.

Sam goes on the run from the law, setting out with Lizzie across the outback. The manhunt for Sam is led by Sergeant Fletcher, who has to contend with the heat, venomous animals, and Aboriginal warriors. Eventually Sam and Lizzie return to turn themselves in, while Fletcher has a gallows constructed and tries to influence the judge who comes to the town to conduct the trial. More details emerge and Sam is acquitted. As he leaves the town in a horse and buggy, he is killed by a sniper.

Cast
 Hamilton Morris as Sam Kelly
 Sam Neill as Fred Smith
 Bryan Brown as Sergeant Fletcher
 Thomas M. Wright as Mick Kennedy
 Matt Day as Judge Taylor
 Ewen Leslie as Harry March
 Natassia Gorey-Furber as Lizzie Kelly
 Gibson John as Archie
 Anni Finsterer as Nell
 Shanica Cole as Lucy
 Tremayne and Trevon Doolan as Philomac
 Luka Magdeline Cole as Olive

Origin
The storyline of the film was inspired by the true story of an Australian Aboriginal man named Wilaberta (or Wilberta or Willaberta) Jack in 1929 and his shooting of ANZAC veteran Harry Henty. Scriptwriter for the film, David Tranter, had previously made a short documentary of the story named Willaberta Jack, which had been nominated for Best Documentary in the Winnipeg Indigenous Film Festival in 2007. Willaberta Jack was his great-uncle and they lived north of Alice Springs.

The Northern Territory was officially part of the colony of New South Wales from 1825 to 1863; it then became part of the colony of South Australia from 1863 to 1 January 1911, when it became a separate federal territory, and remains so today.

Themes and genre
The film is an example of the "meat pie Western", a name used to describe Western-style films set in the Australian outback, although set in more recent times than most in the genre, and rather than tell a simple narrative, it also exposes severe racism unapologetically. One reviewer muses on the label "neo-Western", which invokes a very old genre (including the classic Western doomed hero character) as well as a "sense of newness and revival".

Set in outback Northern Territory about ten years after World War I, rather than the earlier colonial or pre-federation period of Australia's history of many traditional westerns, the film deals with the effects of the war on its white inhabitants, the extreme racism and slavery which existed at that time and how Indigenous workers were used to build the country, and personal morality. It also shows a world where women have little power. Fred is a White character who shows kindness and morality, but even the worst villain (Harry) is also shown as a victim of life in the trenches of the war, who has returned damaged. The film is more than just a story or period piece; it aims to help Australians to understand their history and its legacy in the present time.

The characters and story play out against the character of the harsh yet visually stunning country, and the cinematography is an essential element of the film.

Production
A town built on the station for the film The Drover's Wife: The Legend of Molly Johnson (directed by Leah Purcell), which included a police station and general store, was used for the town scenes. Many cast members were Aboriginal Australians and locals from Alice Springs were employed as extras.

Reception
The film was well received by critics and audiences alike, winning the Audience Award at the 2017 Adelaide Film Festival.

On review aggregator website Rotten Tomatoes, the film holds an approval rating of 96% based on 91 reviews, with an average rating of 8.21/10. The website's critical consensus reads, "Sweet Country makes brilliant use of the Australian outback as the setting for a hard-hitting story that satisfies as a character study as well as a sociopolitical statement". On Metacritic, the film has a weighted average score of 87 out of 100, based on 21 critics, indicating "universal acclaim".

It received positive reviews from many reviewers, with one calling it Thornton's second masterpiece, and one of the best Westerns and Australian films of the century.

Film festivals and awards
Sweet Country premiered at the 74th Venice Film Festival on 6 September 2017, where it won the Special Jury Prize award. Shown in the Platform section at the 2017 Toronto International Film Festival, it won the Platform Prize. It won the Audience Award at the 2017 Adelaide Film Festival and the Best Feature Film at the 2017 Asia Pacific Screen Awards.

Accolades

References

Further reading

True story origin
 Includes details of Harry Henty's ANZAC record, life, etc., with many links to photos and articles
 Tells the story of Henty's death, and a child fathered by him born posthumously, and cites further sources.

Film reviews

Analysis of issues

External links

2017 films
2017 Western (genre) films
Australian Western (genre) films
Films about Aboriginal Australians
Films about slavery
Films about racism
Films about race and ethnicity
Films set in the Outback
Venice Special Jury Prize winners
2010s English-language films